Archeparchy of Tripoli may refer to:
 Melkite Greek Catholic Archeparchy of Tripoli
 Maronite Catholic Archeparchy of Tripoli